Frédéric Marcilly (born October 16, 1977 in Nancy) is a French professional footballer. He currently plays in the Championnat de France amateur for US Raon-l'Étape.

Marcilly played on the professional level in Ligue 1 and Ligue 2 for AS Nancy.

1977 births
Living people
French footballers
Ligue 1 players
Ligue 2 players
AS Nancy Lorraine players
US Raon-l'Étape players
Association football midfielders